Staying on Top is a 2002 American made for cable erotic film directed by John Quinn.

Plot

Background
The film was produced by the production company Indigo Entertainment. It was broadcast several times in summer 2002 at fixed times and on demand on the premium channels Cinemax and Showtime.

Reception
Dr. Gore's Movie Reviews gave the film 2 out of 4.

References

External links
 
 
 

2002 television films
2002 films
American erotic films
Films directed by John Quinn
2000s American films